Preacher Stone is an American southern rock/classic rock band formed in 2008, in Charlotte, North Carolina, by SESAC songwriters Marty Hill and Ronnie Riddle. They released their self-titled debut album in August 2009. FX Networks popular television series Sons of Anarchy launched the band using their music on two seasons.

History
The band was formed by Marty Hill and Ronnie Riddle in 2008. The band consist of Marty Hill and Ben Robinson on guitars, Ronnie Riddle on vocals, Josh Wyatt on drums, Jim Bolt on bass and Johnny Webb on keyboards.

Preacher Stone has performed in the United States and Europe as headliner and as the supporting act for artists such as Blackberry Smoke, ZZ Top, Black Stone Cherry, Lynyrd Skynyrd, Molly Hatchet, The Outlaws, Shooter Jennings, Lucinda Williams, Steve Earle, Charlie Daniels, Marshall Tucker, Lynyrd Skynyrd, Dan Baird and Homemade Sin.

The band released their first album in 2009. Their song Not Today from their debut album appeared in Sons of Anarchy seasons 3 and season 5. They released their second album Uncle Buck's Vittles in 2010. Two songs from their second album were featured in an American independent film Snitch and in Edward Furlong's 2011 movie Absolute Killers. In 2014, they released their third album Paydirt produced by Bruce Irwine.

The band signed an artist management deal with Alien Entertainment in 2016. Their fourth studio album, Remedy, is slated to be released on September 1, 2016, under the NoNo Bad Dog Production label.

Band members

Marty Hill – Lead guitar, slide, dobro and vocals
Ronnie Riddle – Lead vocals, harmonica and mandolin
Ben Robinson – Lead guitar and vocals
Johnny Webb – Keyboards and vocals
Josh Wyatt – Drums, percussion and vocals
Jim Bolt – Bass and vocals

Discography

Preacher Stone (2009)
Uncle Buck's Vittles (2010)
Paydirt (2014)
Remedy (2016)

References

External links
Official website
Preacher Stone at Facebook

Musical groups from North Carolina
American southern rock musical groups
Musical groups established in 2008